Graham Osborne Jones (born 16 September 1949) is a Welsh former professional footballer who played as a defender. He made appearances in the English Football League with Wrexham in the 1960s.

References

1949 births
Living people
Welsh footballers
Association football defenders
Wrexham A.F.C. players
Blaenau Ffestiniog Amateur F.C. players
English Football League players